The women's 200 metres event  at the 1997 IAAF World Indoor Championships was held on March 7–8.

Medalists

Results

Heats
First 2 of each heat (Q) and next 8 fastest (q) qualified for the semifinals.

Semifinals
First 2 of each semifinal (Q) qualified directly for the final.

Final

References

200
200 metres at the IAAF World Indoor Championships
1997 in women's athletics